Lagro is a town in Lagro Township, Wabash County, in the U.S. state of Indiana.  The population was 415 at the 2010 census.

History

The community was named after Le Gris, a Miami Chief. The Lagro post office has been in operation since 1893.

St. Patrick's Roman Catholic Church was listed on the National Register of Historic Places in 1999.

Geography
Lagro is located at  (40.837758, -85.727721), along the Wabash River opposite the mouth of the Salamonie River.

Demographics

2010 census
As of the census of 2010, there were 415 people, 156 households, and 110 families living in the town. The racial makeup of the town was 96.9% White, 1.7% Native American, 0.5% Asian, and 1.0% from two or more races.

There were 156 households, of which 35.9% had children under the age of 18 living with them, 45.5% were married couples living together, 10.9% had a female householder with no husband present, 14.1% had a male householder with no wife present, and 29.5% were non-families. 26.3% of all households were made up of individuals, and 16% had someone living alone who was 65 years of age or older. The average household size was 2.66 and the average family size was 3.11.

The median age in the town was 36.6 years. 26% of residents were under the age of 18; 11.6% were between the ages of 18 and 24; 24.8% were from 25 to 44; 26.2% were from 45 to 64; and 11.3% were 65 years of age or older. The gender makeup of the town was 54.2% male and 45.8% female.

2000 census
As of the census of 2000, there were 454 people, 166 households, and 122 families living in the town. The racial makeup of the town was 98.90% White, 0.66% Native American, and 0.44% from two or more races. Hispanic or Latino of any race were 0.22% of the population.

There were 166 households, out of which 38.0% had children under the age of 18 living with them, 60.8% were married couples living together, 7.2% had a female householder with no husband present, and 26.5% were non-families. 23.5% of all households were made up of individuals, and 10.2% had someone living alone who was 65 years of age or older. The average household size was 2.73 and the average family size was 3.17.

In the town, the population was spread out, with 30.4% under the age of 18, 7.5% from 18 to 24, 31.3% from 25 to 44, 20.3% from 45 to 64, and 10.6% who were 65 years of age or older. The median age was 34 years. For every 100 females, there were 116.2 males. For every 100 females age 18 and over, there were 119.4 males.

The median income for a household in the town was $34,327, and the median income for a family was $39,375. Males had a median income of $37,188 versus $18,056 for females. The per capita income for the town was $13,186. About 3.9% of families and 6.5% of the population were below the poverty line, including 9.5% of those under age 18 and 4.2% of those age 65 or over.

Notable people
 Gene Stratton-Porter (August 17, 1863 – December 6, 1924), author, nature photographer, naturalist, and silent movie-era producer, was born at the Stratton family's farm near Lagro.

References

Towns in Indiana
Towns in Wabash County, Indiana